Alexander Kosolapov (born January 1, 1943, in Moscow, Russia) is a Russian-American sculptor and painter. He immigrated to the United States in 1975 and has since lived and worked in New York City.

Biography
In the late 1950s Kosolapov attended the school of the Surikov Moscow Art Institute. Amongst his classmates were Leonid Sokov and Alexander Yulikov.

After his emigration, the artist played a critical role in assisting in the gathering of materials and clandestine distribution of the unofficial Soviet art magazine A-YA, edited by fellow Russian emigre Igor Chelkovski.

Since his Soviet-era canvases (one of which was displayed in Times Square in 1982), he has produced more modern works, including Mickey Mouse sharing a conversation with Jesus, Tatlin's Tower leaning away from the clutches of a skeleton, and a Mercedes sporting an onion dome.

Public collections
 The State Russian Museum, St. Petersburg, Russia
 The State Tretyakov Gallery, Moscow, Russia
 The Museum of Modern Art (MoMA), New York
 The Solomon R. Guggenheim Museum, New York
 The New Museum, New York
 The Moscow Museum of Modern Art (MMoMA), Moscow, Russia
 The New York Public Library, New York
 The National Centre for Contemporary Arts, Moscow, Russia
 The ART4.RU Museum of Contemporary Russian Art, Moscow, Russia
 The Jane Voorhees Zimmerli Art Museum at Rutgers University, US
 The Nasher Museum of Art at Duke University, US
 The Mead Art Museum, Massachusetts, US

References

External links 
 
 Sloane Gallery of Art

1943 births
Living people
20th-century American painters
American male painters
21st-century American painters
21st-century American male artists
Modern painters
Artists from Moscow
Soviet emigrants to the United States
20th-century Russian sculptors
20th-century American male artists
Russian male sculptors
Jewish sculptors
Russian Jews
20th-century American sculptors
21st-century American sculptors
American male sculptors
20th-century Russian male artists
Stroganov Moscow State Academy of Arts and Industry alumni